Louisiana's 33rd State Senate district is one of 39 districts in the Louisiana State Senate. It has been represented by Republican Stewart Cathey, Jr. since 2020, succeeding fellow Republican Mike Walsworth.

Geography
District 33 covers much of North Louisiana's border with Arkansas, including all of Union and West Carroll Parishes and parts of Claiborne, Lincoln, Morehouse, and Ouachita Parishes. Towns entirely or partially within the district include Oak Grove, Bastrop, Farmerville, Swartz, Monroe, West Monroe, Claiborne, Homer, and Haynesville.

The district is split between Louisiana's 4th and 5th congressional districts, and overlaps with the 11th, 12th, 14th, 15th, 16th, 17th, and 19th districts of the Louisiana House of Representatives.

Recent election results
Louisiana uses a jungle primary system. If no candidate receives 50% in the first round of voting, when all candidates appear on the same ballot regardless of party, the top-two finishers advance to a runoff election.

2019

2015

2011

Federal and statewide results in District 33

References

Louisiana State Senate districts
Claiborne Parish, Louisiana
Lincoln Parish, Louisiana
Morehouse Parish, Louisiana
Ouachita Parish, Louisiana
Union Parish, Louisiana
West Carroll Parish, Louisiana